On October 10, 1973, Vice President Spiro Agnew (a Republican) was forced to resign following a controversy over his personal taxes. Under the terms of the 25th Amendment, a vice presidential vacancy is filled when the president nominates a candidate who is confirmed by both houses of Congress. President Richard Nixon (a Republican) thus had the task of selecting a vice president who could receive the majority support of both houses of Congress, which were then controlled by the Democrats.

President Nixon considered selecting former Texas Governor and Treasury Secretary John Connally, New York Governor Nelson Rockefeller, and California Governor Ronald Reagan. However, Nixon settled on House Minority Leader Gerald Ford of Michigan, a moderate Republican who was popular among the members of Congress (in both parties) and who was good friends with Nixon. Ford won the approval of both houses by huge margins, and was sworn in as the 40th vice president of the United States on December 6, 1973. 

On August 9, 1974, Ford ascended to the presidency after the Watergate scandal led to the resignation of President Nixon, becoming the only president in American history to have never been elected President or Vice President.

Confirmation votes

By a vote of 92 to 3 on November 27, 1973, the Senate confirmed the nomination of Gerald Ford. The following week, on December 6, the House of Representatives gave its approval, 387 to 35. The three senators voting no were Senators William Hathaway of Maine, Thomas Eagleton of Missouri, and Gaylord Nelson of Wisconsin.

See also
1974 United States vice presidential confirmation

Notes

References

External links
 THE ESTABLISHMENT AND FIRST USES OF THE 25TH AMENDMENT, Gerald R. Ford Presidential Digital Library

Vice presidency of the United States
Richard Nixon
Gerald Ford
Twenty-fifth Amendment to the United States Constitution
93rd United States Congress
1973 in American politics